"The First" is the debut double A-side single by South Korean-Chinese boy band NCT Dream, the third sub-unit of the South Korean boy band NCT. It was released on February 9, 2017 with "My First and Last" serving as the single's title track.

Background and release
NCT's third unit, NCT Dream, consists of seven members: Mark, Renjun, Jeno, Haechan, Jaemin, Chenle, and Jisung. They debuted with the digital single "Chewing Gum" on August 24, 2016.

On February 1, 2017, NCT Dream announced that they would be releasing their first single, "The First". SM Entertainment announced that Jaemin will not be participating in this comeback due to his health problems.

Described as a lively dance track with a light-hearted melody and a pounding bass, "My First and Last" served as the album's title track and was released on February 9, in both Korean and Mandarin versions. The album also includes a cover of Lee Seung-hwan's 1993 hit song "Dunk Shot".

Promotion
The group had their first comeback stage on Mnet's M Countdown on February 9 where they performed "My First and Last" and "Dunk Shot".

Commercial performance
"The First" debuted at number one on the Gaon Album Chart on the chart issue dated February 5–11, 2017. It placed at number 40 on Gaon's year-end chart. After years from its release, the album re-entered on the Gaon Chart at number 12 for the month of February, 2021.

Track listing

Credits and personnel 
Credits adapted from Xiami.

 G-Highvocal directing , recording , digital editing 
 Kenzievocal directing , background vocals 
 MQrap directing 
 NCT Dreamvocals, background vocals 
 Markvocals, background vocals , rap making 
 Renjunvocals, background vocals 
 Jenovocals, background vocals 
 Haechanvocals, background vocals 
 Jaeminvocals, background vocals 
 Chenlevocals, background vocals 
 Jisungvocals, background vocals 
 Onestarbackground vocals 
 August Rigobackground vocals 
 Kye Bum-joobackground vocals 
 Choi Hoonbass performer 
 Hong Joon-hoguitar performer 
 Lee Min-gyurecording , digital editing 
 Jeong Eun-gyeongrecording , digital editing 
 Lee Chang-seonrecording 
 Jung Eui-seokrecording , mixing 
 Jang Woo-yeongdigital editing 
 Nam Gung-jinmixing 
 Jin NamKoongmixing 
 Goo Jong-pil (BeatBurger)mixing

Locations
Recording
 SM Big Shot Studio
 SM Blue Cup Studio
 SM Blue Ocean Studio
 SM Yellow Tail Studio
 MonoTree Studio
 In Grid Studio
 prelude Studio

Editing
 SM Big Shot Studio
 SM Yellow Tail Studio
 MonoTree Studio
 doobdoob Studio
 In Grid Studio

Mixing 
 SM Concert Hall Studio
 SM Yellow Tail Studio
 SM Blue Cup Studio

Charts

Weekly charts

Monthly charts

Year-end charts

Accolades

References

2017 debut albums
NCT Dream albums
SM Entertainment albums
Single albums